The Iowa Corn Cy-Hawk Series is an annual athletic competition between Iowa State University and the University of Iowa. On April 12, 2011, it was announced that the competition would be sponsored by the Iowa Corn Promotion Board and the Iowa Corn Growers Association. From 2004–2011, it was sponsored by Hy-Vee and called the Hy-Vee Cy-Hawk Series. The competition includes all head-to-head regular season competitions between the two archrival universities in all shared sports.  Iowa State University leads the series 13-6 after clinching the latest title in December of 2022.

Competition format
Each regular-season game, match, or meet between the Iowa State Cyclones and the Iowa Hawkeyes is counted toward the series championship. The winning team in each sport earns two points for their university (except for football, which is worth three points). In the event that a contest ends in a tie, the points are split. For academics, each school earns a single point if the graduation rate for student athletes exceeds the overall student body rate. The university with the most overall points at the end of the academic year is awarded the Iowa Corn Cy-Hawk Series Trophy (not to be confused with the Cy-Hawk Trophy, which is awarded to the winner of the schools' annual football game). If both schools tie on points at the end of the academic year (as in 2015-16), the school that won the trophy the previous year keeps the series trophy.

History
The Cy-Hawk Series Trophy originated in 2004. Iowa State currently leads with nine overall titles (with one defense in a tie) compared to Iowa with eight. The two schools tied the series in 2015-16 with Iowa State defending the trophy for another year.  Due to the COVID pandemic, the Cy-Hawk Series was paused in 2020–2021.

Overall results

2004–05
Iowa victories are shaded ██ gold. Iowa State victories shaded in ██ cardinal.

2005–06
Iowa victories are shaded ██ gold. Iowa State victories shaded in ██ cardinal.

2006–07
Iowa victories are shaded ██ gold. Iowa State victories shaded in ██ cardinal.

2007–08
Iowa victories are shaded ██ gold. Iowa State victories shaded in ██ cardinal. Ties are white.

2008–09
Iowa victories are shaded ██ gold. Iowa State victories shaded in ██ cardinal.

2009–10
Iowa victories are shaded ██ gold. Iowa State victories shaded in ██ cardinal.

2010–11
Iowa victories are shaded ██ gold. Iowa State victories shaded in ██ cardinal.

2011–12
Iowa victories are shaded ██ gold. Iowa State victories shaded in ██ cardinal.

2012–13
Iowa victories are shaded ██ gold. Iowa State victories shaded in ██ cardinal.

2013–14
Iowa victories are shaded ██ gold. Iowa State victories shaded in ██ cardinal. Ties are white.

2014–15
Iowa victories are shaded ██ gold. Iowa State victories shaded in ██ cardinal.

2015–16
Iowa victories are shaded ██ gold. Iowa State victories shaded in ██ cardinal.

2016–17
Iowa victories are shaded ██ gold. Iowa State victories shaded in ██ cardinal. Ties are white.

2017–18
Iowa victories are shaded ██ gold. Iowa State victories shaded in ██ cardinal. Ties are white.

2018–19
Iowa victories are shaded ██ gold. Iowa State victories shaded in ██ cardinal. Ties are white.

2019–20
Iowa victories are shaded ██ gold. Iowa State victories shaded in ██ cardinal. Ties are white.

2020–21
Series paused due to COVID pandemic.

2021–22
Iowa victories are shaded ██ gold. Iowa State victories shaded in ██ cardinal. Ties are white.

2022–23
Iowa victories are shaded ██ gold. Iowa State victories shaded in ██ cardinal. Ties are white.

See also
 Cy-Hawk Trophy, for the winner in football

References

External links
 

Iowa State Cyclones
College sports rivalries in the United States
Iowa State Cyclones traditions
Iowa Hawkeyes
2004 establishments in Iowa